Double Jeopardy is an American crime film directed by R. G. Springsteen and starring Rod Cameron, Gale Robbins and Allison Hayes. It is also known by the alternative title of Crooked Ring.

The film's art direction was by Carroll Clark.

Cast
 Rod Cameron as Marc Hill  
 Gale Robbins as Marge Baggott  
 Allison Hayes as Barbara Devery  
 Jack Kelly as Jeff Calder  
 John Litel as Emmett Devery  
 Robert Armstrong as Sam Baggott  
 John Gallaudet as Police Lt. Freid  
 Robert Nelson as Police Sgt. McNulty 
 Minerva Urecal as Mrs. Kreesy  
 Tom Powers as Harry Sheldon  
 Dick Elliott as Happy Harry  
 Fern Hall as Miss Webster
 Gay Gallegher as Miss Hunter  
 Howard Price as Ambulance Attendant  
 Rudy Robles as Frank  
 Robert Shayne as Mr. Ross

See also
List of American films of 1955

References

Bibliography
 Spicer, Andrew. Historical Dictionary of Film Noir. Scarecrow Press, 2010.

External links
 

1955 films
1955 crime films
American crime films
Films directed by R. G. Springsteen
Republic Pictures films
1950s English-language films
1950s American films
American black-and-white films